Ischiocentra is a genus of longhorn beetles of the subfamily Lamiinae, containing the following species:

 Ischiocentra clavata Thomson, 1860
 Ischiocentra diringshofeni Lane, 1956
 Ischiocentra disjuncta Martins & Galileo, 1990
 Ischiocentra hebes (Thomson, 1868)
 Ischiocentra monteverdensis Giesbert, 1984
 Ischiocentra nobilitata Thomson, 1868
 Ischiocentra punctata Martins & Galileo, 2005
 Ischiocentra quadrisignata Thomson, 1868
 Ischiocentra stockwelli Giesbert, 1984

References

Onciderini